Sleepy Bears is a 1999 children's picture book by Mem Fox. It is about a bear preparing her family of six baby bears for hibernation.

Reception
In a review of Sleepy Bears, Booklist wrote: "As in Koala Lou (1988), Fox depicts the comfort and security of family without ever resorting to the syrup of many "I love you" books for preschoolers". School Library Journal called it a cleverly written bedtime book, while Kirkus Reviews found it "a bewitching collection of sleepy time rhymes".

Sleepy Bears has also been reviewed by Publishers Weekly, Reading Time, and Australia's Parents.

See also

 Time for Bed - another bedtime book by Mem Fox

References

External links
 Library holdings of Sleepy Bears

1999 children's books
Australian children's books
Picture books by Mem Fox
Books about bears
Sleep in fiction
Pan Books books